Larry Stefanki and Robert Van't Hof were the defending champions, but Van't Hof did not participate this year.  Stefanki partnered Mike Bauer, losing in the quarterfinals.

Eddie Edwards and Danie Visser won the title, defeating John Alexander and Russell Simpson 6–4, 7–6 in the final.

Seeds

  Peter Doohan /  Michael Fancutt (first round)
  Brad Drewett /  Mark Edmondson (semifinals)
  Henri Leconte /  Tim Wilkison (first round)
  Givaldo Barbosa /  Ivan Kley (first round)

Draw

Draw

External links
 Draw

1985 Grand Prix (tennis)
1985 Bristol Open